Marc Herring is an American media executive and communications consultant. He is founder and CEO of Herring Media Group, a USA-UK based consultancy advising global clients in the design and implementation of contemporary media networks, advanced digital communications platforms and capital projects. The firm is developing augmented and interactive assets with intelligent analytics and programmatic media delivery.

Career

Herring is recognized for his pioneering work developing Architectural Media and other advanced, integrated communications solutions in the US, Europe and Africa.

In 1993, in partnership with Gannett and FCB, he developed the first international system of Digital Projection installations as part of an Out of Home advertising network.

Other pioneering achievements in the arts and advertising include producing the first television commercial created on board the International Space Station, organizing worldwide broadcast coverage of the reentry of the MIR space station, and temporarily illuminating vast urban and desert landscapes with live, digital multimedia projections. In March, 2006 Herring's environmental media installation for the Johnathan Harris /  Yahoo! Time Capsule project was accepted by Smithsonian Folkways Recordings for future academic study. Herring previously collaborated with Mickey Hart, Jerry Garcia, R.E.M., and many other performing artists in the creation of live events and touring concerts.

Herring's clients have included: Live Earth / Washington DC with Al Gore, Yahoo! Inc., The Wadsworth Atheneum Museum of Art, SFMOMA, The Smithsonian Institution and it's museums, ILM / Lucas Digital Ltd., Lexus, RadioShack, Procter & Gamble and most major broadcast networks and international advertising agencies.

Herring's projects include international broadcast production and the development of cultural heritage programs for advanced media installations. As part of the original FotoDC, he co-founded, designed and produced an annual  heroic exhibition of projections called Night Gallery DC, which featured the large-scale display of photography and digital imagery curated from the collections of museums and photographers from around the world.  The program ran for five consecutive years and continues in various forms today. Herring staged architectural media works for the re-opening of the National Museum of American History and has provided consultation to various federal government agencies.

Herring's work includes the design and installation of high-rise Architectural Media for Barclays in Times Square and the activation of a comprehensive design-development program to create updated architectural-identity graphics on Barclay's London headquarters on Canary Wharf.

Herring was retained by ABSA – Barclays Africa Ltd., to help deliver the world's largest video billboard for ABSA's headquarters in South Africa. The project was in support of digital services and community messaging across the continent.

Herring consults commercial real estate developers, commercial property owners and corporations on the establishment of advanced digital media platforms and monumental visual displays. Herring also advises a number of global organizations and private family offices on commercial and cultural communications. In partnership with an executive team based in London, he is currently collaborating on the design, management and production of high-visibility public installations, ceremonial events, historic occasions and global broadcast celebrations.

See also
Yahoo! Time Capsule

References

American multimedia artists
Living people
Year of birth missing (living people)